Timothy McDonnell may refer to:

 Timothy A. McDonnell (born 1937), American prelate of the Roman Catholic Church
 Timothy McDonnell (rower) (born 1986), Australian rower